Gonospira is a genus of air-breathing land snails, terrestrial pulmonate gastropod mollusks in the subfamily Orthogibbinae of the family Streptaxidae.

Distribution 
Distribution of the genus Gonospira include:
 Mauritius and Rodrigues
 Réunion

Species
Species within the genus Gonospira include:
 Gonospira adamsiana (G.Nevill & H. Nevill, 1871)
 Gonospira bacilla (L. Pfeiffer, 1856)
 Gonospira barclayi (H. Adams, 1868)
 Gonospira bourguignati(Deshayes, 1863) 
 Gonospira brevis (Morelet, 1867)
 Gonospira callifera (Morelet, 1860)
 Gonospira chloris Crosse, 1873
 Gonospira cylindrella  (H. Adams, 1868) 
 Gonospira deshayesi (H. Adams, 1868)
 Gonospira dupontiana Nevill, 1870
 Gonospira funiculus (Valenciennes in Pfeiffer, 1842)
 Gonospira holostoma Morelet, 1875
 Gonospira larreyi Fischer-Piette, Blanc, C.P., Blanc, F. & Salvat, 1994
 Gonospira madgei Kennard, 1943
 Gonospira majuscula (Morelet, 1878)
 Gonospira mauritiana (Morelet, 1860)
 Gonospira metableta Crosse, 1874
 Gonospira modiola (Férussac, 1821)
 Gonospira mondraini (H. Adams, 1868)
 † Gonospira nevilli (H. Adams, 1867)
 Gonospira palanga (Lesson, 1831)
 Gonospira producta (H. Adams, 1868)
 Gonospira rodriguezensis Crosse, 1873
 Gonospira striaticosta Morelet, 1866
 Gonospira teres (L. Pfeiffer, 1856)
 Gonospira testudiae Fischer-Piette, Blanc, C.P., Blanc, F. & Salvat, 1994
 Gonospira turgidula(Deshayes, 1863) 
 Gonospira uvula Deshayes, 1863 
 Gonospira versipolis (Deshayes, 1851)
 Gonospira viaderi (Madge, 1938)

References

External links
 Germain, L. (1919). Contributions à la faune malacologique de l'Afrique Équatoriale. LVII. Bulletin du Muséum National d'Histoire Naturelle, Zoologie. 25 (4) : 258-265. Paris

 
Streptaxidae
Taxonomy articles created by Polbot